Johan Lindqvist (29 August 1882 – 29 June 1958) was a Swedish long-distance runner. He competed in the men's marathon at the 1908 Summer Olympics.

References

1882 births
1958 deaths
Athletes (track and field) at the 1908 Summer Olympics
Swedish male long-distance runners
Swedish male marathon runners
Olympic athletes of Sweden
Place of birth missing